Sambre-et-Meuse was a department of the French First Republic and French First Empire in present-day Belgium. It was named after the rivers Sambre and Meuse. It was created on 1 October 1795, when the Austrian Netherlands and the Prince-Bishopric of Liège were officially annexed by the French Republic. Prior to this annexation, the territory included in the department had lain in the County of Namur, the Prince-Bishopric of Liège and the Duchies of Brabant and Luxembourg.

The Chef-lieu of the department was Namur. The department was subdivided into the following four arrondissements and cantons:

 Namur: Andenne, Dhuy, Fosses, Gembloux and Namur (2 cantons).
 Dinant: Beauraing, Ciney, Dinant, Florennes and Walcourt. 
 Marche: Durbuy, Érezée, Havelange, La Roche, Marche and Rochefort.
 Saint-Hubert: Gedinne, Nassogne, Saint-Hubert and Wellin.

After Napoleon was defeated in 1814, the department was dissolved and later became part of the United Kingdom of the Netherlands. Its territory is now divided between the Belgian provinces of Namur and Luxembourg.

Administration

Prefects
The Prefect was the highest state representative in the department.

Secretaries-General
The Secretary-General was the deputy to the Prefect.

Subprefects of Dinant

Subprefects of Marche

Subprefects of Namur
The office of Subprefect of Namur was held by the Prefect until 1811.

Subprefects of Saint-Hubert

References

Former departments of France in Belgium
1795 establishments in France
History of Luxembourg (Belgium)
History of Namur